ICEX or variant, may refer to:

 ICEX, the Iceland Stock Exchange 
 ICEX, the Spanish Institute for Foreign Trade ("Instituto Español de Comercio Exterior")
 ICEX (also spelled ICE X), a US Navy mission in the Arctic Ocean 
 Ice X, a form of water ice